Olga Oleksandrivna Dibrova (born 10 March 1977) is Ukraine's Ambassador to Finland.

Life
Dibrova was born in Kryvyi Rih on 10 March 1977. She had her university education at the Kyiv National Taras Shevchenko University. In 1999 she graduated from its School of Oriental Studies. The following year she graduated from their Department of Journalism when she was already an Attaché of the Ukraine's Ministry of Foreign Affairs. Dibrova has a knowledge of several languages and she is fluent in Turkish and English.

She became the Ambassador Extraordinary and Plenipotentiary of Ukraine to Finland on 19 October 2020. In November 2021 she was also made her country's part-time Ambassador to Iceland.

On 24 February 2022 Russia invaded Ukraine. Dibrova spoke of the support that her country needed after the invasion, including weapons, medicine, humanitarian aid and finance. In March 2022, she was invited by ex-Prime Minister and current Speaker of the Parliament of Finland Matti Vanhanen to a plenary session of the Finnish parliament, where she received a standing ovation. Vanhanen told her of the parliament's support for Ukraine and condemnation of the invasion. In that month she also joined 4,000 people who marched to Parliament to express their support for Ukraine.

On Easter Monday 2022 she was speaking at an event protesting at the invasion of Ukraine with Foreign Minister Pekka Haavisto and Helsinki's Deputy Mayor Daniel Sazonov.

References

1977 births
Living people
People from Kryvyi Rih
Taras Shevchenko National University of Kyiv alumni
Ambassadors of Ukraine to Finland
Ambassadors of Ukraine to Iceland
Ukrainian women ambassadors